Andrés Mendieta (born 12 February 1945) is a Spanish former footballer. He competed in the men's tournament at the 1968 Summer Olympics. He is the father of footballer Gaizka Mendieta.

References

External links
 

1945 births
Living people
Spanish footballers
Olympic footballers of Spain
Footballers at the 1968 Summer Olympics
People from Lea-Artibai
Sportspeople from Biscay
Footballers from the Basque Country (autonomous community)
Association football goalkeepers
Deportivo de La Coruña players
Real Madrid CF players
SD Indautxu footballers
Rayo Vallecano players
CD Castellón footballers
La Liga players
Segunda División players